Thomas Woolston (15 June 1853 - 10 April 1938) was an architect and builder.

Family
He was born on 15 June 1853 in Stamford, Lincolnshire, the son of William Woolston (1807-1886) and Mary Jenkinson (1820-1896). He married Mary Hannah Durance (1851-1910) in St George's Church, Stamford on 28 December 1875.

In the 1881 census he is recorded as living at 4 Recreation Ground Road, Stamford, but by 1891 he had moved to 7 Stanley Street, Stamford. In 1901 he is recorded as living at 6 Hampden Street, Beeston and in 1911 at 5 Ireton Street, Beeston.

He died on 10 April 1938 at his home at 6 Ribble Road, Coventry, and was buried on 13 April 1938 in Beeston Cemetery.

Works

His career began as a builder in Stamford in 1879 and for a period of around six months worked in partnership with his brother William.

During this time he built the Wisbech Post Office, and undertook restoration work on several churches including St Botoph's Church, Knottingley, St Mary and St Martin's Church, Blyth and Saltley church.

He sustained a serious injury on 6 August 1889. He was standing on the scaffold of a house near St Michael's Schools when the scaffolding collapsed and he fell from the height of two stories. The fall dislocated his shoulder and he suffered head injuries.

By 1892 he was declared bankrupt and had obtained employment as a foreman mason for Mr. Youngman, builder of Long Eaton.

By the mid 1890s he designed houses in Beeston at the turn of the 20th century and is named as architect in the Building Plans submitted to Beeston District Council.

St Mary and St Martin's Church, Blyth 1885 restoration (as builder)
St Botolph's Church, Knottingley 1886 rebuilding of chancel (as builder) 
Post Office, 1-3 Bridge Street, Wisbech 1887 (as builder)
Two Houses, 17-19 Devonshire Avenue, Beeston 1896 (as architect)
Four houses, Bayley Street / Low Collington Street, Beeston 1896 (as architect)
Two houses, 33-35 Cromwell Street and 55-57 Park Streets, Beeston, 1903 (as architect)
Two villas, 74-76 Imperial Road, Beeston 1903 (as architect)
Houses, 10-12 Ireton Street, Beeston 1904 (as architect)
Two houses, 2-4 Montague Street, Beeston 1904 (as architect)
Three houses, 6-10 Montague Street, Beeston 1905 (as architect)
Two Houses, 1-3 Hampden Grove, Beeston 1906 (as architect)
Stable and Trap House for Mr. Dodson, Muriel Road, Beeston 1906 (as architect)
Two houses, 167-169 Station Road, Beeston 1909 (as architect)

References

Woolston
Woolston
Woolston
Woolston